Armatage is a neighborhood in the Southwest community in Minneapolis. In the city's southwest corner, the neighborhood is bounded on the north by 54th Street West, on the east by Logan Avenue South, on the south by Highway 62, and on the west by the city limits at Xerxes Avenue South. The neighborhood grew around the school named for Maude Armatage, a distinguished community leader. Armatage is built up with mostly single-family housing and some multifamily buildings. The neighborhood also has a park with a community center.

The neighborhood's retail space consists of individual neighborhood stores and is mostly along Penn Avenue South. The great majority of housing was built between 1949 and 1969, while about 5% of the dwellings were built before World War II. 

The Armatage Neighborhood Association (ANA) was founded in 1991 as part of a citywide effort to increase opportunities for residents to connect with the city and allow neighborhoods to address local concerns. ANA board members serve a one-year term commencing in May. The Armatage Summer Festival is an annual party in August at Armatage Park held in partnership with Armatage Park.

Demographics
In 2020, Armatage had a population of about 5,400. About 95% of residents 5 and older speak English at home. 5.8% of residents are foreign born.  

 White 79.7%
 Black 5.7%
 American Indian and Alaska Natives 0.3%
 Asian 3.2%
 Hispanic 5.8%
 Other 0.2%
 Two or more 5.1%

References

Businesses
Businesses in Armatage Neighborhood

External links
Armatage Neighborhood Association
Armatage Recreation Center

Neighborhoods in Minneapolis